The 1997–98 Algerian Championnat National was the 36th season of the Algerian Championnat National since its establishment in 1962. A total of 16 teams contested the league, with CS Constantine as the defending champions, The Championnat started on January 1, 1997. and ended on June 29, 1998.

Team summaries

Promotion and relegation 
Teams promoted from Algerian Division 2 1997-1998 

 USM Annaba
 JSM Béjaïa
 NA Hussein Dey
 JSM Tébessa
 CA Bordj Bou Arreridj
 E Sour El Ghozlane
 JSM Tiaret
 GC Mascara
 RC Kouba
 ASM Oran
 SA Mohammadia
 IRB Hadjout

Teams relegated to Algerian Division 2 1998-1999
 No relegated

Group A

Result table

Group B

Result table

Championship final

References

External links
1997–98 Algerian Championnat National

Algerian Championnat National
Championnat National
Algerian Ligue Professionnelle 1 seasons